Jeff Pierce may refer to:

Jeff Pierce (cyclist) (born 1958), American road bicycle racer
Jeff Pierce (baseball) (born 1969), Major League Baseball pitcher
Jeffrey Pierce (born 1971), American actor, film director and film producer
Jeffrey Lee Pierce (1958–1996), American singer, songwriter and guitarist

See also
Jefferson Pierce also known as Black Lightning, a DC Comics character 
Jeff Pearce (disambiguation)